Jambey Tashi ( – 2 November 2022) was an Indian politician of the Bharatiya Janata Party in Arunachal Pradesh, serving as the MLA of 1-Lumla constituency. He was also a Member of National Minority Morcha, BJP. Tashi had previously been a member of the Indian National Congress and People's Party of Arunachal.

In 2009, he was elected unopposed from 1-Lumla S/T Assembly Constituency on a Congress ticket. In the 2014 election for the 1-Lumla Legislative Assembly of Arunachal Pradesh he defeated Independent candidate Theg Tse Rinpoche, on a Congress ticket, by 1499 votes. In 2019 Legislative Assembly elections, he rode on a BJP ticket and defeated Jampa Thrinly Kunkhap of NPP by 1288 votes. Jambey Tashi garnered 4567 votes while Jampa Thrinly Kunkhap got 3279 votes. He was the incumbent  Member of Legislative Assembly of the 1 Lumla (Arunachal Pradesh) constituency.

Tashi was one of 6 MLAs along with Chief Minister Pema Khandu to be suspended by the PPA for anti-party activities.

Tashi died on 2 November 2022, at the age of 44.

References

1970s births
Year of birth missing
2022 deaths
Indian National Congress politicians
Arunachal Pradesh MLAs 2014–2019
People's Party of Arunachal politicians
Bharatiya Janata Party politicians from Arunachal Pradesh
Arunachal Pradesh MLAs 2009–2014
Arunachal Pradesh MLAs 2019–2024
People from Tawang district